Mid Staffordshire Postgraduate Medical Centre is a Medical Education establishment situated in Stafford, England. The Centre is located in the grounds of County Hospital, and opened in 1986.

The centre includes conference rooms, lecture theatres, a library, and the remaining buildings that belonged to the demolished Coton Hill Asylum, consisting of a lodge building and a chapel.

References

External links 
 Mid Staffordshire Postgraduate Medical Centre website

Buildings and structures in Stafford
Medical schools in England
Education in Stafford